Penicillium dodgei is a species of the genus of Penicillium.

See also
 List of Penicillium species

References 

dodgei
Fungi described in 1980